The Mammoth Hot Springs Historic District is a  historic district in Yellowstone National Park comprising the administrative center for the park.  It is composed of two major parts: Fort Yellowstone, the military administrative center between 1886 and 1918, and now a National Historic Landmark, and a concessions district which provides food, shopping, services, and lodging for park visitors and employees. It was added to the National Register of Historic Places on March 20, 2002, for its significance in architecture, conservation, entertainment/recreation, and military. The district includes 189 contributing buildings.

Description
Fort Yellowstone is a carefully ordered district of substantial buildings that clearly indicate their military origins. The U.S. Army administered the park from 1886 to 1918 when administration was transferred to National Park Service. The park headquarters is now housed in the original double cavalry barracks (constructed in 1909). The Horace Albright Visitor Center is located in the old bachelors' officers quarters (constructed in 1909).

The concessions district contrasts with the military district, with a less formal arrangement and style and includes the Mammoth Hot Springs Hotel and Dining Room, a gas station, and retail stores. The Yellowstone Main Post Office, itself on the National Register of Historic Places sits just north of Fort Yellowstone. The  residential area includes houses designed by architect Robert Reamer.

The district is directly adjacent to the Mammoth Hot Springs thermal area, and is itself built on an ancient travertine terrace. The Grand Loop Road Historic District runs through the Mammoth district, and the North Entrance Road Historic District adjoins just to the north.

Gallery

See also
Fort Yellowstone
Grand Loop Road Historic District
Lake Fish Hatchery Historic District
North Entrance Road Historic District
Roosevelt Lodge Historic District
Old Faithful Historic District

References

External links

Mammoth Hot Springs Historic District at the Wyoming State Historic Preservation Office

Park buildings and structures on the National Register of Historic Places in Wyoming
Buildings and structures in Yellowstone National Park in Wyoming
Buildings and structures in Park County, Wyoming
Historic American Buildings Survey in Wyoming
Historic districts on the National Register of Historic Places in Wyoming
National Register of Historic Places in Park County, Wyoming
National Register of Historic Places in Yellowstone National Park